M22, M.22 or M-22 may refer to:

Transportation

Aviation
 BFW M.22, prototype, 1928 German bomber
 Jancsó-Szokolay M22, 1937 Hungarian sailplane
 Magni M-22 Voyager, autogyro
 Mooney M22 Mustang, 1964 American light aircraft
 Shvetsov M-22, a Soviet version of the Bristol Jupiter aircraft engine
 Russellville Municipal Airport (FAA LID: M22)

Road transport
 M22 (New York City bus), a New York City Bus route in Manhattan
 Highway M22 (Ukraine)
 M-22 (Michigan highway), a state highway in Michigan
 M22 (Cape Town), a Metropolitan Route in Cape Town, South Africa
 M22 (Johannesburg), a Metropolitan Route in Johannesburg, South Africa
 M22 (Pretoria), a Metropolitan Route in Pretoria, South Africa
 M22 (Durban), a Metropolitan Route in Durban, South Africa
 M22 motorway (Northern Ireland)

Military
 HMS M22, Royal Navy M15 class monitor; later HMS Media 
 M22 Locust, a light tank of World War II
 M-22 Uragan/Shtil (SA-N-7, Gadfly), Soviet naval multirole SAM system
 M22, the US Army designation for a type of 7x50 binoculars produced by Steiner-Optik

Other
 M 22, a political movement of the 1970s and 1980s in Congo-Brazzaville
 M22, a vitrification agent or cryoprotectant, used in cryonics and cryopreservation
 The Mathieu group M22 in the mathematical field of group theory
 M22 graph, in graph theory
 Messier 22, a globular cluster in the constellation Sagittarius
 Mälar 22, sailboat class
 M-22, a British-German DJ and producer duo consisting of Matt James and Frank Sanders.